The Roman Catholic Diocese of Croae is a titular see of the Roman Catholic Church. It used to consist of the city of Krujë in Albania.

Bishops
Titular Bishop Isidoro Aparici Gilart (Appointed 25 January 1694 - Died 1 January 1711)
Titular Bishop Giovanni Battista di Mandello, O.F.M. Obs. (Appointed 14 February 1792 - Died 25 Jun 1804)
Titular Bishop Andrea Canova, O.F.M. Cap. (Appointed 14 December 1847 - Died 10 August 1866)
Titular Bishop Moise Amberbojan, C.M.V. (Appointed 27 February 1885 - Died 1898)
Titular Bishop Giovanni Barcia (Appointed 24 April 1902 - Died 1912)
Titular Bishop Antônio José dos Santos, C.M. (Appointed 13 December 1918 Appointed - Appointed Bishop of Assis, São Paulo, 22 November 1929)
Titular Bishop Crisanto Luque y Sánchez (Appointed 16 January 1931 - Appointed Bishop of Tunja, 9 September 1932)
Titular Biship John Bernard MacGinley (Appointed 26 September 1932 - Died 18 October 1969)
Titular Bishop Evelio Ramos Díaz (Appointed 26 October 1970 - Died 25 November 1976)
Titular Bishop Edgardo Gabriel Storni (Appointed 4 January 1977 Appointed - Appointed Archbishop of Santa Fe, 28 August 1984)
Titular Bishop Santiago García Aracil (Appointed 20 November 1984 - Appointed Bishop of Jaén, 31 May 1988)
Titular Bishop Michel Malo, Ist. del Prado (Appointed 1 September 1988 - Appointed Bishop of Mahajanga, 29 March 1966)
Titular Bishop Emilio Simeón Allué Carcasona, S.D.B. (Appointed 24 July 1996 - Died 26 April 2020)
Titular Bishop Bruce Alan Lewandowski, C.Ss.R. (Appointed 10 June 2020 - )

References

Titular sees